Yavuz Özkan (born 19 May 1985) is a Turkish former professional footballer who played as a goalkeeper.

Life and career
Özkan began his career with his hometown club Denizlispor. He signed a youth contract with the club in 1999, but never played a professional match for the club. He was transferred to Denizli Belediyespor in 2004.

Özkan moved to Bursaspor in 2006. He was loaned to Tarsus Idman Yurdu for the second half of the 2007–08 season and was a part of the Bursaspor squad that won the Süper Lig in 2009–10.

Honours
Bursaspor
Süper Lig: 2009–10

References

1985 births
Living people
Turkish footballers
Bursaspor footballers
Tarsus Idman Yurdu footballers
Denizli Belediyespor footballers
Adanaspor footballers
Şanlıurfaspor footballers
Süper Lig players
Sportspeople from Denizli
TFF First League players
Association football goalkeepers